Thelenota is a genus of sea cucumber in the family Stichopodidae.

Description and characteristics 
They are massive sea cucumbers, more or less rectangular in cross-section. The oral face (called trivium) is flat, and covered with numerous aligned podia. The tegument is thick, and covered with thick papillae and other tubercles. The oral tentacles are peltate, helping to collect the sediment to ingest.

Species
 Thelenota ananas Jaeger, 1833 – Pineapple sea cucumber
 Thelenota anax Clark, 1921 – Giant sea cucumber
 Thelenota rubralineata Massin & Lane, 1991 – Red-lined sea cucumber

References

Stichopodidae
Holothuroidea genera
Taxa named by Johann Friedrich von Brandt